Marc Joannette (born November 3, 1968) is a Canadian National Hockey League referee, who wears uniform number 25. As of the end of the 2007–08 NHL season, he has officiated 470 regular season and 28 playoff games. His first game was on October 1, 1999. He officiated on April 6, 2007 when Martin Brodeur broke Bernie Parent's single season wins record with his 48th win of the season. He was selected to officiate the 2008 and 2009 Stanley Cup Finals. He was selected to officiate the 2010 Vancouver Olympic Games in Canada.

On October 5, 2008, Joannette was involved in an odd play in a game between the Columbus Blue Jackets and the Toronto Maple Leafs. Early in the third period, Jackets winger Jason Chimera was skating across the ice in the Leafs' zone to hit Leafs winger Alexei Ponikarovsky when Joannette suddenly crossed Chimera's path, causing him and Chimera to collide. The force of the impact knocked Chimera's helmet off, but both he and Joannette got right back to their feet. The Leafs ended up scoring on the ensuing rush, as Ponikarovsky put the puck in the back of the net. The goal gave the Leafs a 4-2 lead, but the Jackets would end up tying the game, and winning it in overtime.

References 

Featured Officials nhlofficials.com Retrieved June 6, 2008

1968 births
Living people
National Hockey League officials
French Quebecers
Canadian ice hockey officials
People from Verdun, Quebec
Ice hockey people from Montreal